Dyer County High School is a public Title I high school located in Newbern, Tennessee. It is an operated by the Dyer County Schools system.  The school features its own botanical gardens located on the campus.
The school is home to the 2011–12, 2012–13, 2013–14, and 2014-15 TSSAA State Cheerleading Champions as well as the 2012–13, 2013–14, and 2014–15 UCA National High School Cheerleading Co-ed Champions.

Notable alumni
Notable people to have attended the school include:
 T. J. Frier, American football defensive tackle
 Robert Hubbs III, semi professional basketball player

References

External links
Dyer County High School website

Public high schools in Tennessee
Schools in Dyer County, Tennessee
1972 establishments in Tennessee